Loch Leven railway station served the burgh of Kinross, Perth and Kinross, Scotland from 1860 to 1921 on the Kinross-shire Railway.

History 
The station opened as Kinross sometime after 20 September 1860 by the North British Railway. To the northwest was a goods yard and a locomotive shed. Its name was changed to Loch Leven on 1 October 1871 when the Devon Valley Railway opened. To the south, also opposite the goods yard, was the signal box. The station closed on 1 September 1921.

References

External links 

Disused railway stations in Perth and Kinross
Former North British Railway stations
Railway stations in Great Britain opened in 1860
Railway stations in Great Britain closed in 1921
1860 establishments in Scotland
1921 disestablishments in Scotland